The 2020 Kansas Jayhawks football team represented the University of Kansas as a member of Big 12 Conference during the 2020 NCAA Division I FBS football season. It was the Jayhawks 131st season. The Jayhawks were led by second-year head coach Les Miles. The team play home games at David Booth Kansas Memorial Stadium in Lawrence, Kansas.

The Jayhawks began the season 0–4 and struggled statistically through the first four games, losing by an average of 20.5 point, while being outgained on offense on average 451.8 to 261.3 and having a turnover margin of –4. Through games on October 17, they were one of only two winless teams in the country that had played at least four games.

The Jayhawks finished winless for only the third time in school history and the second time since the 2015 season.

Offseason

Starters lost
Overall, the Jayhawks had 25 players run out of eligibility. Below are the starters from 2019 who have run out of eligibility.

Coaching staff changes

Recruiting
The Jayhawks have 26 commitments for their 2020 recruiting class. Below is the breakdown. In addition to their 26 recruited freshmen, the Jayhawks also have 13 walk-on freshmen. The only positions KU did not have any recruits for were running back, kicker, and punter.

Overall class ranking

Positional breakdown

Left team during the season

Big 12 media poll
The 2020 preseason poll was released on July 17, 2020. The Jayhawks were picked last for the 10th consecutive season, receiving 80 out of 90 possible last place votes.

Schedule

COVID-19 impact

On June 20, 2020, the University of Kansas announced it had tested 86 football players and 110 staff members. Only one player tested positive and no staff members. One player tested positive for the antibody test, indicating the player had it in the past, but no longer had it. On July 3, the team announced that another 11 players had tested positive and that they would be suspending in-person voluntary workouts.
Kansas was scheduled to play New Hampshire, but the game was canceled following the CAA’s decision to not play football during the 2020 season due to the COVID-19 pandemic. Following the cancellation, KU athletic director Jeff Long said in a statement that they will look into finding an opponent to replace New Hampshire in the opening of the schedule. On July 25, Kansas announced it had replaced the game with New Hampshire with a game on August 29 against Southern Illinois, but that game was later cancelled. On July 29, their game against Boston College was also canceled. On August 3, the Big 12 announced they would play a 10-game schedule that included all conference games and one non-conference game. On August 12, the Big 12 announced the conference portion of the revised schedule. On August 31, the school announced that they will begin the season without fans in attendance, but did not specify how many games will be played without fans. On September 24, Long announced a maximum of 10,000 fans would be allowed to attend through the month of October. On October 8, head coach Les Miles announced that he had tested positive for COVID-19. Because of his positive test, he did not coach the game against West Virginia. A few days before the Jayhawks November 21 game against Texas, it was rescheduled for December 14, then it was cancelled altogether on December 10. In total, four of the Jayhawks games were cancelled due to COVID-19.

Season schedule
Every game listed below, unless otherwise noted, had a limited attendance due to COVID-19.

Source:

Roster

Positional breakdown

Breakdown by class

Game summaries
Game lines listed below are subject to multiple changes leading up to the game. The line listed is the last available line. Lines are from Bovada.

Coastal Carolina

The game was originally scheduled for September 26 at Brooks Stadium in Conway, South Carolina, but was moved to Lawrence. The Chanticleers began the game with a 28–0 run, shutting out Kansas until they kicked a field goal as time expired in the first half. The Jayhawks would outscore Coastal Carolina 20–10 in the second half, but the Chanticleers still held on to win the game.

at Baylor

The Jayhawks scored 3 minutes and 31 minutes into the game on a 21-yard run by Pooka Williams Jr. After that, Baylor would score 40 unanswered points scoring 5 touchdowns, a field goal, and a safety, including a 100-yard kickoff return for a touchdown at the start of the second half. Williams added another touchdown late in the game, as did Baylor running back Craig Williams. The Jayhawks would lose 14–47, extending their Big 12 road conference losing streak to 46 games dating back to October 4, 2008 when the Jayhawks defeated Iowa State 35–33.

Oklahoma State

The game featured two of the premier running backs in the Big 12, Pooka Williams Jr. of Kansas and Chuba Hubbard from Oklahoma State, who are both top 10 all-time in career rushing yards at their respective schools. Williams was held to a season low 32 yards rushing and a 2.2 yard average, while Hubbard ran for 145 yards and two touchdowns. The Jayhawks were dominated on both sides of the ball throughout the game as they were held to only 193 yards of total offense and allowed 593 yards on defense. The Jayhawks were shut out through the first three quarters of the game and didn't score until Oklahoma State had taken their starters out of the game. The loss extended the Jayhawks losing streak against teams ranked in the AP poll to 39 games.

at West Virginia

The team played the game without Les Miles due to his positive COVID-19 test. Joshua Eargle served as the interim head coach for the game. The Jayhawks jumped ahead to an early 10–0 lead including forcing their first turnover of the season. The Mountaineers would score 38 unanswered points before the Jayhawks would score again. The loss extended the Jayhawks losing streak in road conference games to 51. Following the game, two-time first team All-Big 12 running back Pooka Williams Jr. opted out of the remainder of the season.

at Kansas State

The Jayhawks began the game playing strong on defense holding K-State to no offensive touchdowns until late in the second quarter. However, due to poor special teams play and turnovers, they ended the 1st half down 7–34. They would eventually lose 14–55, extending multiple losing streaks: overall losing streak (9), AP ranked teams (39), road conference (52), and loses to K-State (12).

Iowa State

The Jayhawks struggled offensively yet again, with the majority of their offensive yards came from freshman quarterback Jalon Daniels, who accounted for 201 yards of the Jayhawks 240 yards. The struggles on offense led to defensive struggles as well as KU fell 22–55 extending their overall losing streak to 10 games and their losing streak against ranked teams to 40 games.

at Oklahoma

TCU

at Texas Tech

Coaching staff

References

Kansas
Kansas Jayhawks football seasons
College football winless seasons
Kansas Jayhawks football